Tengoku (天国) is the Japanese word for Heaven and may refer to:

 Drift Tengoku, an automobile magazine
 Rhythm Tengoku, a music video game
 Tengoku Kara no Yell, a film
 Tengoku Daimakyō, a manga